World Oral Health Day is observed annually on 20 March, and launches a year-long campaign dedicated to raising global awareness of the issues around oral health and the importance of oral hygiene so that governments, health associations and the general public can work together to achieve healthier mouths and happier lives. 

Of the world's population, 90% will suffer from oral diseases in their lifetime, many avoidable. Organized by FDI World Dental Federation, World Oral Health Day involves campaigns by national dental associations from around the world with activities in over 130 countries.

History

World Oral Health Day was launched on 20 March 2013 by FDI World Dental Federation. The day also marks the launch of a year-long campaign to raise awareness of oral health and prevention of oral diseases. Since 2013 these campaigns have featured a specific theme.

Dental Students Competition 
Since 2014 and in collaboration with its daughter organization, the International Association of Dental Students (IADS), FDI organizes an annual worldwide competition for best awareness and prophylactic activities held by dental student organizations in celebration of World Oral Health Day.

Winners of WOHD Dental Students Competition:
 2014: Egypt and Sudan
 2015: Turkey and Saudi Arabia
 2016: Poland, Iraq (Kurdistan) and Egypt
 2017: Spain, Egypt, Sudan and Palestine
In February 2017, IADS launched WOHD Portal for organizing digitally the application and reviewing process of its national and local member organizations action plans and final reports.

World Oral Health Day Themes

2013: Healthy Teeth for Healthy Life
2014: Brush for a Healthy Mouth!
2015: Smile for Life!
2016: It All Starts Here. Healthy mouth. Health body.
2017: Live Mouth Smart
2018: Say Ahh: Think Mouth, Think Health
2019: Say Ahh: Act On Mouth Health
2020: Say Ahh: Unite for Mouth Health
2021 - 2023: Be Proud of Your Mouth

See also 
 FDI World Dental Federation
 International Association of Dental Students (IADS)

References

External links
World Oral Health Day
FDI World Dental Federation
World Oral Health Day 2016
International Association of Dental Students

March observances
Oral Health